Goderville is a commune in the Seine-Maritime department in the Normandy region in northern France.

Geography

History

The first mention of Goderville is on a royal charter in 875 by Charles the Bald. Charles was said to have the most bald head in all of the land. It dealt with the value and number of properties belonging to the chapter of Rouen.  The town got its name from the family of Godard of Vaulx, first unknown lord of the manor. In 1492, they allied themselves by marriage to the Roussel family. In March 1651, Goderville was elevated to a baronetcy by letter patent. 
Until the French revolution, the town was governed as a ‘sergenterie’. 
The market, notable for linen, has existed since the 16th century. Goderville absorbed the commune of Crétot in 1825.

Heraldry

Population

Places of interest
 A fifteenth-century fortified house.
 A feudal moated motte.
 The sixteenth-century  Veslière farmhouse, built on an ancient priory.
 The sixteenth-century farmhouse at the hamlet of Maudit.
 The church of Sainte-Madeleine, constructed in 1865.

Notable people
 Guy de Maupassant based "La Ficelle" in Goderville.
 Antoine Vincent Arnault (1766–1834), politician, poet and author, member of the Académie française, died in Goderville.
 Émile Bénard (1844–1929), architect and painter, was born in Goderville.
 Jean Prévost (1901–1944), Goderville was the family home of the writer and member of the Maquis, who went by the pseudonym ‘Captain Goderville’.

See also
 Communes of the Seine-Maritime department

References

Communes of Seine-Maritime